The Hmong people (RPA: Hmoob, Nyiakeng Puachue: , Pahawh Hmong:) are an indigenous group in East and Southeast Asia. In China,  the Hmong people are classified as a sub-group of the Miao people. The modern Hmong reside mainly in Southwest China (Guizhou, Yunnan, Sichuan, Chongqing, and Guangxi) and countries in Southeast Asia such as Vietnam, Laos, Thailand, and Myanmar. There is also a very large diasporic community in the United States, comprising more than 300,000 Hmong. The Hmong diaspora also has smaller communities in Australia and South America (specifically Argentina and French Guiana, the latter being an overseas region of France).

Etymology

In China, Hmong are not recognized by their native name, rather they are categorized under the umbrella term "Miao" along with three other indigenous groups of people by the government in 1949. The term Miao is a Chinese word and is only accepted in China as it is deemed offensive elsewhere.

Little is known about the origin of the Miao term and the people it referenced to historically, as the Hans used it loosely to identify non-Hans in Southern China. Its origin can be dated before the Qin dynasty (221 BCE). Thereafter, it was perceived as barbarians, especially during the Miao's rebellions against the Ming and Qing dynasties between the 1300s and early 1900s. These wars are still chanted by guides during Hmong funerals when guiding the spirits of the deceased individuals to their origins so they can reincarnate.

The term Maew and Meo derived from the term Miao.

The term Miao or Meo (meaning "cats", "barbarians", and even "Sons of the Soil") was officially used in reference to the Hmong in Southeast Asia until the 1970s, when Dr. Yang Dao, a Hmong scholar, advocated for the term "Hmong" with the support of clan leaders and General Vang Pao. 
Yang Dao had insisted that the terms "Meo" and "Miao" were both unacceptable as his people had always called themselves by the name "Hmong," which he defined as “free men.” Surrounding countries began to use the term "Hmong" after the US Department of State used it during Immigration screening in Thailand's Ban Vinai Refugee Camp.

In 1994, Pobzeb Vang registered the term "Hmong" with the United Nations, making it the proper term to identify the Hmong people internationally. Soon after, there was a political push from Hmong American politicians and activists to replace the term Miao with the term Hmong in China with little to no success. To date, China is the only country that doesn't recognize the term Hmong.

The term Hmong is the English pronunciation of the Hmong's native name. It is a singular and plural noun (e.g., Japanese, French, etc.). When pronouncing the term Hmong, the "G" is silent. More recently the silent of the "H" has been based on preference. This is mainly because when pronouncing it in the Hmong Leng (Leeg) dialect the "H" is silent (i.e., Moob), while it is not in the Hmong Der (Dawb) dialect (i.e., Hmoob). Very little is known about the native Hmong name as it isn't mentioned in Chinese historical records since the Hans identified the Hmong as Miao. The meaning of it is debatable and no one is sure of its origin although it can be traced back to several provinces in China. However, most Hmong Americans and Hmong Laotians often associate it with "Free" and/or "Hmoov" (Fate) as it serves as a reminder to them of their history of fighting oppression.

Origins

Genetic origins

A recent DNA study in Thailand found that Hmong paternal lineage is quite different from those lu Mien and other Southeast Asian tribes. The Hmong-Mien and Sino-Tibetan speaking people are known as hill tribes in Thailand; they were the subject of the first studies to show an impact of patrilocality vs. matrilocality on patterns of mitochondrial (mt) DNA vs. male-specific portion of the Y chromosome (MSY) variation.
According to linguist Martha Ratliff, there is linguistic evidence to suggest that they have occupied some of the same areas of southern China for over 8,000 years. Evidence from mitochondrial DNA in Hmong–Mien–speaking populations supports the southern origins of maternal lineages even further back in time, although it has been shown that Hmong-speaking populations had comparatively more contact with northern East Asians than had the Mien.

Homeland 
The most likely homeland of the Hmong–Mien languages is in Southern China between the Yangtze and Mekong rivers.

Migration of people speaking these languages from South China to Southeast Asia took place ca. 1600–1700 CE. Ancient DNA evidence suggests that the ancestors of the speakers of the Hmong–Mien languages were a population genetically distinct from that of the Tai–Kadai and Austronesian language source populations at a location on the Yangtze River. Recent Y-DNA phylogeny evidence supports the proposition that people who speak the Hmong–Mien languages are descended from a population that is distantly related to those who now speaks the Mon-Khmer languages.

The time of Proto-Hmong-Mien has been estimated to be about 2500 BP (500 BC) by Sagart, Blench, and Sanchez-Mazas using traditional methods employing many lines of evidence, and about 4243 BP by the Automated Similarity Judgment Program (ASJP), an experimental algorithm for automatic generation of phonologically based phylogenies.

History

In China

Hmong traditions and legends indicate that they originated near the Yellow River region of northern China, but this is not substantiated by any scientific evidence. According to linguist Martha Ratliff, there is linguistic evidence to suggest that they have occupied some of the same areas of southern China for over 8,000 years. Evidence from mitochondrial DNA in Hmong–Mien–speaking populations supports the southern origins of maternal lineages even further back in time, although it has been shown that Hmong-speaking populations had comparatively more contact with northern East Asians than had the Mien. A rare haplogroup, O3d, was found at the Daxi culture in the middle reaches of the Yangtze River, indicating that the Daxi people might be the ancestors of modern Hmong-Mien populations, which show only small traces of O3d today.

Chi You is the Hmong ancestral Hmong God of War. Today, a statue of Chi You has been erected in the town named Zhuolu. The author of Guoyu, authored in the 4th to 5th century, considered Chi You's Jiu Li tribe to be related to the ancient ancestors of the Hmong, the San-Miao people.

In 2011, Hmong DNA was sampled and found to contain 7.84% D-M15 and 6%N(Tat) DNA. The research found a common ancestry between Hmong-Mien peoples and Mon-Khmer people groups dating to the Last Glacial Maximum approximately 15,000 to 18,000 years ago.

Conflict between the Hmong of southern China and newly arrived Han settlers increased during the 18th century under repressive economic and cultural reforms imposed by the Qing dynasty. This led to armed conflict and large-scale migrations well into the late 19th century, the period during which many Hmong people immigrated to Southeast Asia. The migration process had begun as early as the late-17th century, however, before the time of major social unrest, when small groups went in search of better agricultural opportunities.

The Hmong people were subjected to persecution and genocide by the Qing dynasty government. Kim Lacy Rogers wrote: "In the eighteenth and nineteenth centuries, while the Hmong lived in south-western China, their Manchu overlords had labeled them 'Miao' and targeted them for genocide."

Since 1949, the Miao people has been an official term for one of the 56 official minority groups recognized by the government of the People's Republic of China. The Miao live mainly in southern China, in the provinces of Guizhou, Hunan, Yunnan, Sichuan, Guangxi, Hainan, Guangdong, and Hubei. According to the 2000 censuses, the number of 'Miao' in China was estimated to be about 9.6 million. The Miao nationality includes Hmong people as well as other culturally and linguistically related ethnic groups who do not call themselves Hmong. These include the Hmu, Kho (Qho) Xiong, and A-Hmao. The White Miao (Bai Miao) and Green Miao (Qing Miao) are Hmong groups.

Vietnam
The Hmong or Miao began to migrate to Tonkin (Northern Vietnam) in 19th century, where they struggled to establish their community on the high mountains. They recognized the Tai-speaking overlords of valleys, who were vassals of the Vietnamese court in Hue. The Hue court of Tu Duc at the time was facing crisis after crisis, unable to retake control of Tonkin and the border regions, which the Taiping rebellion and other Chinese rebels spillover to Vietnam had pushed it into anarchy. In here, Hmong communities humbly thrived on either sides of the Red River, harmonizing among other ethnic groups, and they were largely ignored by all factions.

During the colonization of 'Tonkin' (North Vietnam) between 1883 and 1954, a number of Hmong decided to join the Vietnamese Nationalists and Communists, while many Christianized Hmong sided with the French. After the Viet Minh victory, numerous pro-French Hmong had to fall back to Laos and South Vietnam.

Laos
After decades of distant relations with the Lao kingdoms, closer relations between the French military and some Hmong on the Xieng Khouang plateau were set up after World War II. There, a particular rivalry between members of the Lo and Ly clans developed into open enmity, also affecting those connected with them by kinship. Clan leaders took opposite sides and as a consequence, several thousand Hmong participated in the fighting against the Pathet Lao Communists, while perhaps as many were enrolled in the People's Liberation Army. In Laos, numerous Hmong also genuinely tried to avoid getting involved in the conflict in spite of the extremely difficult material conditions under which they lived during wartime.

The U.S. and the Laotian Civil War

In the early 1960s, partially as a result of the North Vietnamese invasion of Laos, the U.S. Central Intelligence Agency's (CIA) Special Activities Division began to recruit, train and lead the indigenous Hmong people in Laos to fight against North Vietnamese Army divisions invading Laos during the Vietnam War. This "Secret Army" was organized into various mobile regiments and divisions, including various Special Guerrilla Units, all of whom were led by General Vang Pao. An estimated sixty-percent (60%) of Hmong men in Laos joined up.

While Hmong soldiers were known to assist the North Vietnamese in many situations, Hmong soldiers were also recognized for serving in combat against the NVA and the Pathet Lao, helping block Hanoi's Ho Chi Minh trail inside Laos and rescuing downed American pilots. Though their role was generally kept secret in the early stages of the conflict, they made great sacrifices to help the U.S.

Thousands of economic and political refugees have resettled in Western countries in two separate waves. The first wave resettled in the late 1970s, mostly in the United States, after the North Vietnamese and Pathet Lao takeovers of the pro-US governments in South Vietnam and Laos respectively. The Lao Veterans of America, and Lao Veterans of America Institute, helped to assist in the resettlement of many Laotian and Hmong refugees and asylum seekers in the United States, especially former Hmong veterans and their family members who served in the "U.S. Secret Army" in Laos during the Vietnam War.

Hmong Lao resistance

For many years, the Neo Hom resistance and political movement played a key role in resistance to the Vietnam People's Army in Laos following the U.S. withdrawal in 1975. Vang Pao played a significant role in this movement. Additionally, a spiritual leader Zong Zoua Her, as well as other Hmong leaders, including Pa Kao Her or Pa Khao Her, rallied some of their followers in an additional factionalized guerrilla resistance movement called ChaoFa (RPA: Cob Fab,). These events led to the yellow rain controversy when the United States accused the Soviet Union of supplying and using chemical weapons in this conflict.

Small groups of Hmong people, many of the second or third generation descendants of former CIA soldiers, remain internally displaced in remote parts of Laos, in fear of government reprisals. Faced with continuing military operations against them by the government and a scarcity of food, some groups have begun coming out of hiding, while others have sought asylum in Thailand and other countries. Hmong in Laos, in particularly, developed a stronger and deeper anti-Vietnamese sentiment than their Vietnamese Hmong cousins, due to historic persecution perpetrated by the Vietnamese against them.

Controversy over repatriation

In June 1991, after talks with the UNHCR and the Thai government, Laos agreed to the repatriation of over 60,000 Lao refugees living in Thailand, including tens of thousands of Hmong people. Very few of the Lao refugees, however, were willing to return voluntarily. Pressure to resettle the refugees grew as the Thai government worked to close its remaining refugee camps. While some Hmong people returned to Laos voluntarily, with development assistance from UNHCR, coercive measures and forced repatriation was used to send thousands of Hmong back from whence they had fled. Of those Hmong who did return to Laos, some quickly escaped back to Thailand, describing discrimination and brutal treatment at the hands of Lao authorities.

In the 1980s, 1990s and early 2000s, The Center for Public Policy Analysis, a non-governmental public policy research organization, and its Executive Director, Philip Smith, played a key role in raising awareness in the U.S. Congress and policy-making circles in Washington, D.C. about the plight of the Hmong and Laotian refugees in Thailand and Laos. The CPPA, backed by a bipartisan coalition of members of the U.S. Congress and human rights organizations, conducted numerous research missions to the Hmong and Laotian refugee camps along the Mekong River in Thailand, as well as the Buddhist temple of Wat Tham Krabok.

Amnesty International, the Lao Veterans of America, Inc., the United League for Democracy in Laos, Inc., Lao Human Rights Council, Inc. (led by Dr. Pobzeb Vang Vang Pobzeb, and later Vaughn Vang) and other non-governmental organizations (NGOs) and human rights organizations joined the opposition to forced repatriation.

Although some accusations of forced repatriation were denied, thousands of Hmong people refused to return to Laos. In 1996, as the deadline for the closure of Thai refugee camps approached, and under mounting political pressure, the U.S. agreed to resettle Hmong refugees who passed a new screening process. Around 5,000 Hmong people who were not resettled at the time of the camp closures sought asylum at Wat Tham Krabok, a Buddhist monastery in central Thailand where more than 10,000 Hmong refugees were already living. The Thai government attempted to repatriate these refugees, but the Wat Tham Krabok Hmong refused to leave and the Lao government refused to accept them, claiming they were involved in the illegal drug trade and were of non-Lao origin.

In 2003, following threats of forcible removal by the Thai government, the U.S., in a significant victory for the Hmong, agreed to accept 15,000 of the refugees. Several thousand Hmong people, fearing forced repatriation to Laos if they were not accepted for resettlement in the U.S., fled the camp to live elsewhere within Thailand where a sizable Hmong population has been present since the 19th century.

In 2004 and 2005, thousands of Hmong fled from the jungles of Laos to a temporary refugee camp in the Thai province of Phetchabun.

The European Union, UNHCHR, and international groups have since spoken out about the forced repatriation.

Alleged plot to overthrow the government of Laos
 
On 4 June 2007, as part of an investigation labeled Operation Tarnished Eagle, U.S. federal courts ordered warrants issued for the arrest of Vang Pao and nine others for plotting to overthrow the government of Laos in violation of the federal Neutrality Acts and for multiple weapons charges. The federal charges alleged that members of the group inspected weapons, including AK-47s, smoke grenades, and Stinger missiles, with the intent of purchasing them and smuggling them into Thailand in June 2007, where they were intended to be used by Hmong resistance forces in Laos. The one non-Hmong person of the nine arrested, Harrison Jack, a 1968 West Point graduate and retired Army infantry officer, allegedly attempted to recruit Special Operations veterans to act as mercenaries.

To obtain the weapons, Jack allegedly met unknowingly with undercover U.S. federal agents posing as weapons dealers, prompting the warrants, part of a long-running investigation into the activities of the U.S.-based Hmong leadership and its supporters.

On 15 June, the defendants were indicted by a grand jury and a warrant was also issued for the arrest of an 11th man allegedly involved in the plot. Simultaneous raids of the defendants' homes and work locations, involving over 200 federal, state and local law enforcement officials, were conducted in approximately 15 cities in Central and Southern California in the US.

Multiple protest rallies in support of the suspects, designed to raise awareness of the treatment of Hmong peoples in the jungles of Laos, took place in California, Minnesota, Wisconsin, Alaska, and several of Vang Pao's high-level supporters in the U.S. criticized the California court that issued the arrest warrants, arguing that Vang was a historically important American ally and a valued leader of U.S. and foreign-based Hmong. However, calls for then Californian Republican Governor Arnold Schwarzenegger and then President George W. Bush to pardon the defendants were not answered, presumably pending a conclusion of the large and then still-ongoing federal investigation.

On 18 September 2009, the US federal government dropped all charges against Vang Pao, announcing in a release that the federal government was permitted to consider "the probable sentence or other consequences if the person is convicted." On 10 January 2011, after Vang Pao's death, the federal government dropped all charges against the remaining defendants saying, "Based on the totality of the circumstances in the case, the government believes, as a discretionary matter, that continued prosecution of defendants is no longer warranted," according to court documents.

Thailand
The presence of Hmong settlements in Thailand is documented from the end of the 19th century on. Initially, the Siamese paid little attention to them. But in the early 1950s, the state suddenly took a number of initiatives aimed at establishing links. Decolonization and nationalism were gaining momentum in the peninsula and wars of independence were raging. Armed opposition to the state in northern Thailand, triggered by outside influence, started in 1967 while again many Hmong refused to take sides in the conflict. Communist guerrilla warfare stopped by 1982 as a result of an international concurrence of events that rendered it pointless. Priority has since been given by the Thai state to sedentarizing the mountain population, introducing commercially viable agricultural techniques and national education, with the aim of integrating these non-Tai animists within the national identity.

In the United States

Many Hmong refugees resettled in the United States after the Vietnam War. Beginning in December 1975, the first Hmong refugees arrived in the U.S., mainly from refugee camps in Thailand; however, only 3,466 were granted asylum at that time under the Indochina Migration and Refugee Assistance Act of 1975. In May 1976, another 11,000 were allowed to enter the United States, and by 1978 some 30,000 Hmong people had immigrated. This first wave was made up predominantly of men directly associated with General Vang Pao's secret army. It was not until the passage of the Refugee Act of 1980 that families were able to enter the U.S., becoming the second wave of Hmong immigrants. Hmong families scattered across all 50 states but most found their way to each other, building large communities in California, Minnesota and Wisconsin. Smaller, but still sizeable communities also formed in Michigan (Detroit), Montana (Missoula), and Alaska (Anchorage).

Culture
Hmong people have their own terms for their subcultural divisions. Hmong Der (Hmoob Dawb), and Hmong Leng (Hmoob Leeg) are the terms for two of the largest groups in the United States and Southeast Asia. These subgroups are also known as the White Hmong, and Blue or Green Hmong, respectively. These names originate from the color and designs of women's dresses in each respective group, with the White Hmong distinguished by the white dresses women wear on special occasions, and the Blue/Green Hmong by the blue batiked dresses that the women wear. The name and pronunciation "Hmong" is exclusively used by the White Hmong to refer to themselves, and many dictionaries use only the White Hmong dialect.

In the Romanized Popular Alphabet, developed in the 1950s in Laos, these terms are written Hmoob Dawb (White Hmong) and Hmoob Leeg (Green Hmong). The final consonants indicate with which of the eight lexical tones the word is pronounced.

White Hmong and Green Hmong speak mutually intelligible dialects of the Hmong language, with some differences in pronunciation and vocabulary. One of the most characteristic differences is the use of the voiceless /m̥/ in White Hmong, indicated by a preceding "H" in Romanized Popular Alphabet. Voiceless nasals are not found in the Green Hmong dialect. Hmong groups are often named after the dominant colors or patterns of their traditional clothing, style of head-dress, or the provinces from which they come.

Vietnam and Laos
The Hmong groups in Vietnam and Laos, from the 18th century to the present day, are known as Black Hmong (Hmoob Dub), Striped Hmong (Hmoob Txaij), White Hmong (Hmoob Dawb), Hmong Leng (Hmoob Leeg) and Green Hmong (Hmoob Ntsuab). In other places in Asia, groups are also known as Black Hmong (Hmoob Dub or Hmong Dou), Striped Hmong (Hmoob Txaij or Hmoob Quas Npab), Hmong Shi, Hmong Pe, Hmong Pua, and Hmong Xau, Hmong Xanh (Green Hmong), Hmong Do (Red Hmong), Na Mieo and various other subgroups. These include the Flower Hmong or the Variegated Hmong (Hmong Lenh or Hmong Hoa), so named because of their bright, colorful embroidery work (called pa ndau or paj ntaub, literally "flower cloth").

Hmong/Mong controversy

When Western authors first came in contact with Hmong people in the 18th century, they referred to them by writing ethnonyms which were previously assigned to them by the Chinese (i.e., Miao, or variants).  This practice continued into the 20th century. Even ethnographers studying the Hmong people in Southeast Asia often referred to them as Meo, a corruption of Miao applied by Thai and Lao people to the Hmong. Although "Meo" was an official term, it was often used as an insult against the Hmong people, and it is considered to be derogatory.

The issue came to a head during the passage of California State Assembly Bill (AB) 78, in the 2003–2004 season. Introduced by Doua Vu and Assembly Member Sarah Reyes, District 31 (Fresno), the bill encouraged changes in secondary education curriculum to include information about the Secret War and the role of Hmong people in the war. Furthermore, the bill called for the use of oral histories and first-hand accounts by Hmong people who had participated in the war and were caught up in its aftermath. Originally, the language of the bill mentioned only "Hmong" people, intending to include the entire community. Several Mong Leng activists, led by Dr. Paoze Thao (Professor of Linguistics and Education at California State University, Monterey Bay), drew attention to the problems associated with omitting "Mong" from the language of the bill. They noted that despite nearly equal numbers of Hmong Der and Mong Leng in the United States, resources are disproportionately allocated to the Hmong Der community. This not only includes scholarly research, it also includes the translation of materials, including the curriculum proposed by the bill. Despite these arguments, "Mong" was not added to the bill. In the version of the bill which was passed by the assembly, "Hmong" was replaced by "Southeast Asians," a broader and more inclusive term.

Dr. Paoze Thao and some others strongly feel that "Hmong" can only be used in reference to Hmong Der people because it does not include "Mong" Leng people. He feels that the use of "Hmong" in reference to both groups perpetuates the marginalization of the Mong Leng language and culture. Thus, he advocates the use of "Hmong" and "Mong" in reference to the entire ethnic group. Other scholars, including anthropologist Dr. Gary Yia Lee (a Hmong Der person), suggests that for the past 30 years, "Hmong" has been used in reference to the entire community and as a result, the inclusion of Mong Leng people is understandable. Some argue that such distinctions create unnecessary divisions within the global community and they also argue that the use of these same distinctions will only confuse non-Hmong and Mong people who are both trying to learn more about Hmong and Mong history and culture.

As a compromise alternative, multiple iterations of "Hmong" have been proposed. A Hmong theologian, Rev. Dr. Paul Joseph T. Khamdy Yang has proposed the use of the term "HMong" in reference to the Hmong and the Mong communities by capitalizing the H and the M. The ethnologist Jacques Lemoine has also begun to use the term (H)mong in reference to the entirety of the Hmong and Mong communities.

Hmong and Miao

Some non-Chinese Hmong advocate for the term 'Hmong' to be used not only to designate their dialect group  They generally claim that the word "Miao" or "Meo" is a derogatory term, with connotations of barbarism, that probably should not be used at all. The term was later adopted by Tai-speaking groups in Southeast Asia where it took on especially insulting associations for Hmong people despite its official status.

In modern China, the term "Miao" does not carry these negative associations and people of the various sub-groups that constitute this officially recognized nationality freely identify themselves as Miao or Chinese, typically reserving more specific ethnonyms for intra-ethnic communication. During the struggle for political recognition after 1949, it was members of these ethnic minorities who campaigned for identification under the umbrella term "Miao"taking advantage of its familiarity and associations of historical political oppression.

Contemporary transnational interactions between Hmong in the West and Miao groups in China, following the 1975 Hmong emigration, led to the development of a global Hmong identity that includes linguistically and culturally related minorities in China with no previous ethnic affiliation. Scholarly and commercial exchanges, increasingly made over the Internet, have also resulted in an exchange of terminology, including some Hmong people accepting the designation "Miao" after visiting China and some nationalist non-Hmong Miao peoples identifying as Hmong. Such realignments of identity, while largely the concern of economically elite community leaders reflects a trend towards the interchangeability of the terms "Hmong" and "Miao."

Diaspora

Linguistic data show that the Hmong of the peninsula stem from the Miao of southern China as one among a set of ethnic groups belonging to the Hmong–Mien language family. Linguistically and culturally speaking, the Hmong and the other sub-groups of the Miao have little in common.

Vietnam, where their presence is attested from the late 18th century onwards and characterized with both assimilation, cooperation and hostility, is likely to be the first Indochinese country into which the Hmong migrated. 
At the 2019 national census, there were 1,393,547 Hmong living in Vietnam, the vast majority of them in the north of the country. The traditional trade in coffin wood with China and cultivation of the opium poppy – not prohibited in Vietnam until 1993 – long guaranteed a regular cash income. Today, converting to cash cropping is the main economic activity. As in China and Laos, Hmong participate to a certain degree in local and regional administration. In the late 1990s, several thousands of Hmong started moving to the Central Highlands and some crossed the border into Cambodia, constituting the first attested presence of Hmong settlers in that country.

In 2015, the Hmong in Laos numbered 595,028. Hmong settlement there is nearly as ancient as in Vietnam.

After the 1975 Communist victory, thousands of Hmong from Laos had to seek refuge abroad (see Laos below). Approximately 30 percent of the Hmong left, although the only concrete figure we have is that of 116,000 Hmong from Laos and Vietnam together seeking refuge in Thailand up to 1990.

In 2002 the Hmong in Thailand numbered 151,080.

Myanmar most likely includes a modest number of Hmong (perhaps around 2,500) but no reliable census has been conducted there recently.

As result of refugee movements in the wake of the Indochina Wars (1946–1975), in particular, in Laos, the largest Hmong community to settle outside Asia went to the United States where approximately 100,000 individuals had already arrived by 1990. By the same date, 10,000 Hmong had migrated to France, including 1,400 in French Guiana, Canada admitted 900 individuals, while another 360 went to Australia, 260 to China, and 250 to Argentina. Over the following years and until the definitive closure of the last refugee camps in Thailand in 1998, additional numbers of Hmong have left Asia, but the definitive figures are still to be produced.

Approximately 5% of the Hmong population currently lives outside of Asia, with the United States home to the largest Hmong diaspora community. The 2008 census counted 171,316 people solely of Hmong ancestry, and 221,948 persons of at least partial Hmong ancestry. Other countries with significant populations include:
 France: 15,000
 Australia: 2,000
 French Guiana: 1,500
 Canada: 835
 Argentina: 600

The Hmong population within the United States is centered in the Upper Midwest (Wisconsin, Minnesota) and California.

Vietnam

Hmong people in Vietnam have been perceived differently by various modern political organizations and in different historical periods. Since the Hmong are an ethnic minority in Vietnam, their loyalty toward the Vietnamese state has been frequently questioned by the state. However, many Hmong in Vietnam are fiercely loyal to the Vietnamese state, regardless of the current ideologies of the government with the Hmong in Laos and Cambodia most supportive of active resistance. These tend to be Hmong Christians that have been targeted by all three Indochinese governments. The Hmong in Vietnam also receive cultural and political promotion from the government which led to the Vietnamese Hmong further diverging from the Laotian Hmong, as the latter are strongly anti-Vietnamese due to the Secret War and Communism.

Laos

There are 595,028 Hmong people in Laos. They mainly live in northern regions of Laos.

Thailand

The Hmong presence in Thailand dates back, according to most authors, to the turn of the 20th century when families migrated from China through Laos and Burma. A relatively small population, they still settled dozens of villages and hamlets throughout the northern provinces. The Hmong were then registered by the state as the Meo hill tribe. Then, more Hmong migrated from Laos to Thailand following the victory of the Pathet Lao in 1975. While some ended up in refugee camps, others settled in mountainous areas among more ancient Hill Tribes.

Americas

Many Hmong refugees resettled in the United States after the Vietnam War. Beginning in December 1975, the first Hmong refugees arrived in the U.S., mainly from refugee camps in Thailand; however, only 3,466 were granted asylum at that time under the Indochina Migration and Refugee Assistance Act of 1975. In May 1976, another 11,000 were allowed to enter the United States, and by 1978 some 30,000 Hmong people had immigrated. This first wave was made up predominantly of men directly associated with General Vang Pao's secret army. It was not until the passage of the Refugee Act of 1980 that families were able to enter the U.S., becoming the second wave of Hmong immigrants. Hmong families scattered across all 50 states but most found their way to each other, building large communities in California, Minnesota and Wisconsin. As of the 2010 census, 260,073 Hmong people reside in the United States the majority of whom live in California (91,224), Minnesota (66,181), and Wisconsin (49,240), an increase from 186,310 in 2000. Of them, 247,595 or 95.2% are Hmong alone, and the remaining 12,478 are mixed Hmong with some other ethnicity or race. The vast majority of part-Hmong are under 10 years old.

In terms of cities and towns, the largest Hmong-American community is in St. Paul (29,662), followed by Fresno (24,328), Sacramento (16,676), Milwaukee (10,245), and Minneapolis (7,512).

There are smaller Hmong communities scattered across the United States, including those in Minnesota (Rochester, Mankato, Duluth) Michigan (Detroit and Warren); Anchorage, Alaska; Denver, Colorado; Portland, Oregon; Washington; North Carolina (Charlotte, Morganton); South Carolina (Spartanburg); Georgia (Auburn, Duluth, Monroe, Atlanta, and Winder); Florida (Tampa Bay); California (Merced); Wisconsin(Madison, Eau Claire, Appleton, Green Bay, Milwaukee, Oshkosh, La Crosse, Sheboygan, Manitowoc, and Wausau); Aurora, Illinois; Kansas City, Kansas; Tulsa, Oklahoma; Missoula, Montana; Des Moines, Iowa; Springfield, Missouri; Arkansas, Fitchburg, Massachusetts, and Providence, Rhode Island.

Sunisa "Suni" Lee of Saint Paul, Minnesota is a notable Hmong-American; she is a three time Olympic medalist in artistic gymnastics. In the 2020 Summer Olympics, Lee won silver in the women's artistic team all-around, followed by gold in the women's artistic individual all-around and bronze in the women's uneven bars. With these results, Sunisa made history as both the first Hmong-American to compete in the Olympics in any sport and the first Hmong-American to win an Olympic medal.

Canada's small Hmong population is mostly concentrated within the province of Ontario. Kitchener, Ontario has 515 residents of Hmong descent, and has a Hmong church.

There is also a small community of several thousand Hmong who migrated to French Guiana in the late 1970s and early 1980s, that can be mainly found in the Hmong villages of Javouhey (1200 individuals) and Cacao (950 individuals).

Religious persecution
Hmong Catholics, Protestants and Animists have been subjected to military attacks, police arrest, imprisonment, forced disappearances, extrajudicial killings, and torture in Laos and Vietnam on anti-religious grounds.

A significant example was the deportation of Zoua Yang and her 27 children from Thailand on 19 December 2005, after the group was arrested attending a church in Ban Kho Noi, Phetchabun Province, Thailand and Ms. Yang and her children were detained upon their return to Laos, after which the whereabouts of much of the family remain unknown.

In 2011, Vietnam People's Army troops were used to crush a peaceful demonstration by Hmong Catholic, Protestant and Evangelical Christians who gathered in Dien Bien Province and the Dien Bien Phu area of northwestern Vietnam, according to Philip Smith of the Center for Public Policy Analysis, independent journalists and others. In 2013, Vam Ngaij Vaj, a Christian pastor of Hmong ancestry, was beaten to death by Vietnamese police and security forces. In Hanoi, Vietnamese government officials refused to allow medical treatment for a Hmong Christian leader, Duong Van Minh, who was suffering from a serious kidney illness, in February 2014.

The U.S. Commission on International Religious Freedom has documented official and ongoing religious persecution, religious freedom violations against the Laotian and Hmong people in both Laos and Vietnam by the governments. In April 2011, the Center for Public Policy Analysis also researched and documented cases of Hmong Christians being attacked and summarily executed, including four Lao Hmong Christians.

See also

 Chi You, (Huab Tais Txiv Yawg) a noted ancestor of the Hmong People
 Hmong churches
 Hmong cuisine
 Hmong customs and culture
 Hmong funeral
 Hmong music
 Hmong textile art
 Indochina refugee crisis
 Ban Phou Pheung Noi
 Wangyee Vang
 Vang Pobzeb
 Vang Pao
 List of Hmong people
 Long Tieng
 Sheboygan Hmong Memorial
 The Art of Not Being Governed
 Bhutanese people
 Khmu people
 Nepalis
 Nyaw people
 Tai Dam people
 Tibetans
 Burmese people

Notes

References

Sources 

 
 Forbes, Andrew, and Henley, David, 'Chiang Mai's Hill Peoples' in: Ancient Chiang Mai Volume 3. Chiang Mai: Cognoscenti Books, 2012. .
 Hillmer, Paul. A People's History of the Hmong (Minnesota Historical Society Press, 2010). 327 pages. .
 [TYPN 1992] The section on nomenclature draws heavily on Thai-Yunnan Project Newsletter, Number 17, June 1992, Department of Anthropology, Australian National University. Material from that newsletter may be freely reproduced with due acknowledgment.
 W.R. Geddes. Migrants of the Mountains: The Cultural Ecology of the Blue Miao (Hmong Njua) of Thailand. Oxford, England: The Clarendon Press, 1976.
 Tapp, N., J.Michaud, C.Culasc, G.Y.Lee (Eds.) (2004). Hmong/Miao in Asia. Chiang Mai (Thailand): Silkworm. 500 pages.
 Vang, Chia Youyee. Hmong America: Reconstructing Community in Diaspora (University of Illinois Press; 2011) 200 pages; Combines scholarly and personal perspectives in an ethnographic history of the Hmong refugee experience in the United States.
 "Hmong in Minnesota". Minnesota Historical Society, Explore Minnesota.

Further reading

 Edkins, The Miau-tsi Tribes. Foochow: 1870.
 Henry, Lingnam. London: 1886.
 Bourne, Journey in Southwest China. London: 1888.
 A. H. Keaw, Man: Past and Present. Cambridge: 1900.
 
 Johnson, Charles. Dab Neeg Hmoob: Myths, Legends and Folk Tales from the Hmong of Laos. St. Paul, Minnesota: Macalester College, 1983. – bilingual oral literature anthology, includes introduction and explanatory notes from a language professor who had sponsored the first Hmong family to arrive in Minnesota
 Lee, Mai Na M. "The Thousand-Year Myth: Construction and Characterization of Hmong." (Archive) Hmong Studies Journal. v2n2. Northern hemisphere Spring 1998.
 Meneses, Rashaan. "Hmong: An Endangered People." UCLA International Institute.
 Merritt, Tragic Mountains: The Hmong, the Americans, and the Secret Wars for Laos, 1942–1992. Indiana: 1999.
 Mottin, Father Jean. History of the Hmong. Bangkok: Odeon Store, 1980. written in Khek Noi, a Hmong village in northern Thailand, Translated into English by an Irish nun, printed in Bangkok.
 Quincy, Keith. Hmong: History of a People. Cheney, Wash.: Eastern Washington University Press, 1988.
 Savina, F.M. Histoire des Miao. 2nd Edition. Hong Kong: Impremerie de la Société des Missions-Etrangères de Paris, 1930. Written by a French missionary who worked in Laos and Tonkin.
 George, William Lloyd. "Hmong Refugees Live in Fear in Laos and Thailand." TIME. Saturday 24 July 2010.
 Hookaway, James. "Thai Army Forces Out Refugees." The Wall Street Journal. 28 December 2009.

External links

  Laotian and Hmong veterans and refugee families of the Lao Veterans of America, Inc.
 Center for Public Policy Analysis (CPPA) in Washington, D.C. Hmong human rights, religious persecution/ religious freedom violations and refugee issues
 Hmong-related web sites  edited by Mark Pfeifer of the Hmong Cultural Center.
 Laos & Hmong Refugee Crisis & human rights violations against Hmong people in Southeast Asia, Centre for Public Policy Analysis, Washington, D.C.
 Publications list
 Hmong Studies Internet Resource Center 
 Hmong culture studies  multimedia educational content
 Hmong history and culture articles by Hmong Australian anthropologist, Dr. Gary Yia Lee
 Hmong Contemporary Issues by Hmong French anthropologist and linguist, Dr. Kao-Ly Yang (English, French, and Hmong languages)
 Being Hmong Means Being Free Wisconsin Public Television
 Learn about Hmong People & Culture
Hmong Culture

 
Hmong diaspora
 
Ethnic groups in China
Ethnic groups in Laos
Ethnic groups in Thailand
Ethnic groups in Vietnam